Cassa di Risparmio di Imola (CR Imola) was an Italian savings bank based in Imola, in the Province of Bologna, Emilia-Romagna. It currently a department and a brand of Banco Popolare.

History
Cassa di Risparmio di Imola was found in 1855 in Imola, in the Papal States.

In 1992, due to Legge Amato, the statutory corporation was split into a private limited company and a banking foundation. Casse Emiliano Romagnole was introduced as a minority shareholders for 20% shares. In 1997 the foundation bought back the shares.

Banca Popolare di Lodi
In 2000, the bank had 29 branches. In the same year, CR Imola became part of Banca Popolare di Lodi (BPL) which owned 62.18% shares indirectly through Bipielle Partecipazioni, Istituto di Credito delle Casse di Risparmio Italiane, Efibanca and Holding Cassa di Risparmio di Imola as sub-holding companies. In 2001, BPL owned 96.95% shares (67.91% through Bipielle Partecipazioni and 29.04% directly). In 2002 CR Imola was merged with Banca Bipielle Romagna to form Banca Bipielle Adriatico. BPL owned 83.10% shares of the subsidiary through sub-holding Bipielle Retail. However, in 2003 the bank was absorbed into BPL. BPL was merged with BPVN to form Banco Popolare. A new subsidiary was incorporated to own part of the former assets of BPL.

Relaunch as brand
In 2008, BPL relaunched CR Imola as one of their brands. In 2011, after BPL was absorbed into the parent company, CR Imola became a department of bank division Banca Popolare di Verona instead since 2012.

See also

 Cassa di Risparmio in Bologna
 Rolo Banca
 Banca di Imola

References

External links
 Fondazione Cassa di Risparmio di Imola 

Defunct banks of Italy
Banks established in 1855
1855 establishments in the Papal States
Banks disestablished in 2003
Italian companies disestablished in 2003
Companies based in the Metropolitan City of Bologna
Banco Popolare
Imola
Italian companies established in 1855